Hendrik "Henk" Johan Lubert Vonhoff (22 June 1931 – 25 July 2010) was a Dutch politician of the People's Party for Freedom and Democracy (VVD) and teacher.

Vonhoff attended the State Civic School of Amsterdam in Amsterdam from April 1950 until May 1957 majoring in Education obtaining a Bachelor of Education degree. Vonhoff worked as a history teacher in Amsterdam from June 1957 until February 1967 and as a political consultant for the People's Party for Freedom and Democracy from January 1952 until February 1967 and as a political pundit for De Telegraaf and Elsevier from March 1959 until February 1967.

Vonhoff was elected as a Member of the House of Representatives after the election of 1967, taking office on 23 February 1967 serving as a frontbencher and spokesperson for Education, Social Work, Military Personnel and deputy spokesperson for Culture, Media and Kingdom Relations. After the election of 1971 Vonhoff was appointed as State Secretary for Culture, Recreation and Social Work in the Cabinet Biesheuvel I, taking office on 28 July 1971. The Cabinet Biesheuvel I fell just one year later on 19 July 1972 after the Democratic Socialists '70 (DS'70) retracted their support following there dissatisfaction with the proposed budget memorandum to further reduce the deficit and continued to serve in a demissionary capacity until the first cabinet formation of 1972 when it was replaced by the caretaker Cabinet Biesheuvel II with Vonhoff continuing as State Secretary for Culture, Recreation and Social Work, taking office on 9 August 1972. After the election of 1972 Westerterp returned as a Member of the House of Representatives, taking office on 23 January 1973 but he was still serving in the cabinet and because of dualism customs in the constitutional convention of Dutch politics he couldn't serve a dual mandate he subsequently resigned as State Secretary for Culture, Recreation and Social Work on 23 April 1973 and he continued to serve in the House of Representatives as a frontbencher chairing the parliamentary committee for Education and Sciences and spokesperson for Education, Social Work and Culture,.

In August 1974 Vonhoff was nominated as Mayor of Utrecht, he resigned as a Member of the House of Representatives the same day he was installed as Mayor, taking office on 6 September 1974. In November 1980 he was nominated as Queen's Commissioner of Groningen, he resigned as Mayor the same day he was installed as Queen's Commissioner, serving from 16 December 1980 until 1 July 1996. Vonhoff also became active in the private sector and public sector and occupied numerous seats as a corporate director and nonprofit director on several boards of directors and supervisory boards (Groninger Museum, University Medical Center Groningen,  Radio Netherlands Worldwide, Noordelijk Scheepvaartmuseum and the Royal Library) and served on several state commissions and councils on behalf of the government (Advisory Council for Spatial Planning, Council for Culture, Cadastre Agency, Hoge Veluwe National Park, Nature Protection Council, Institute for Sound and Vision and the Public Pension Funds PFZW) and worked as a trade association executive for the Beer and Mineral Water Manufacturers association (BBM) serving as Chairman of the Executive Board from February 1977 until May 1992 and for the Retail association (MKB) serving as Chairman of the Executive Board from August 1982 until October 1996 and as a sport administrator for the National Olympic Committee (NOC) serving as President of the Dutch Olympic Committee from 21 May 1985 until 27 January 1989. After the election of 1986 Vonhoff was approached as Minister of Defence in the Cabinet Lubbers II but per his own request asked not to be considered for a cabinet post in the new cabinet.

Vonhoff was known for his abilities as a debater and consensus builder.

Decorations

References

External links

Official
  H.J.L. (Henk) Vonhoff Parlement & Politiek

1931 births
2010 deaths
Businesspeople from Amsterdam
Commanders of the Order of the Crown (Belgium)
Commanders of the Order of Orange-Nassau
Dutch corporate directors
Dutch nonprofit directors
Dutch nonprofit executives
Dutch sports executives and administrators
Dutch trade association executives
Academic staff of Erasmus University Rotterdam
Knights of the Order of the Netherlands Lion
King's and Queen's Commissioners of Groningen
Mayors of Utrecht
Members of the House of Representatives (Netherlands)
Politicians from Amsterdam
People from Hilversum
People's Party for Freedom and Democracy politicians
State Secretaries for Social Work of the Netherlands
Writers from Amsterdam
20th-century Dutch businesspeople
20th-century Dutch civil servants
20th-century Dutch historians
20th-century Dutch male writers
20th-century Dutch politicians
21st-century Dutch businesspeople
21st-century Dutch civil servants
21st-century Dutch historians
21st-century Dutch male writers